Walter D'Souza may refer to:

Walter D'Souza (cricketer) (?–2020), Indian cricketer
Walter de Sousa (1920–1989), Indian field hockey player